Xero may refer to:

Xero (band), an Australian punk band
Xero (company), a New Zealand financial software company
Xero (film), an experimental 2010 German film
Xero (Linkin Park), an early name for the band Linkin Park, as well as a demo tape of the same name
Xero (rapper), Detroit-based hip-hop artist and songwriter
Xero (SF fanzine), American fanzine published from 1960 to 1963
Xero Shoes, a brand of minimalist footwear

See also
 Xeros (disambiguation)
 Zero (disambiguation)